"Freaks" is a song by British neo-progressive rock band Marillion. First released in 1985 on the B-side to the number five UK hit single "Lavender", in November 1988 it was released in a live version on a double A-side single together with the band's 1985 number two hit, "Kayleigh". The single was intended to promote the forthcoming double-live album The Thieving Magpie, which documents the band's history with singer Fish, who had left the band in October 1988; as such, this was Marillion's last single to feature Fish on vocals and cover art by Mark Wilkinson, who would go on to collaborate with Fish.

The single peaked at no. 24 in the UK Singles Chart, becoming their eleventh consecutive UK Top 40 hit.

The track "Freaks" (recorded at an open-air concert at the May Market Fairground in Mannheim, Germany, on 21 June 1986) was only included on the CD and cassette versions of The Thieving Magpie, "Kayleigh" (recorded at London Hammersmith Odeon on 9 or 10 January 1986) was also available on the vinyl edition, which only featured the first half of the Misplaced Childhood album. The 12" version contained an additional two tracks from the second half of Misplaced Childhood, which are also not found on the vinyl version of The Thieving Magpie.

A CD replica of the single was also part of a collectors box-set released in July 2000 which contained Marillion's first twelve singles and was re-issued as a 3-CD set in 2009 (see The Singles '82–'88).

Track listing

7" Single* / Cut-out picture disc

Side A
"Freaks (Live)" — 4:12

Side B
"Kayleigh (Live)" — 4:08
*On the Dutch version of the 7" single, which was re-released in January 1989, "Kayleigh" and "Freaks" are reversed.

12" Single

Side A
"Freaks (Live)" — 4:12
"Kayleigh (Live)" — 4:08

Side B
"Childhoods End? (Live)" — 3:10
"White Feather(Live)" — 4:00

5" CD Single
"Freaks (Live)" — 4:12
"Kayleigh (Live)" — 4:08
"Childhoods End? (Live)" — 3:10
"White Feather(Live)" — 4:00

Personnel
Fish – vocals
Steve Rothery – guitars
Mark Kelly – keyboards
Pete Trewavas – bass
Ian Mosley – drums

References 

1988 singles
Marillion songs
1986 songs
EMI Records singles
Songs written by Steve Rothery
Songs written by Mark Kelly (keyboardist)
Songs written by Ian Mosley
Songs written by Pete Trewavas
Songs written by Fish (singer)